Cordesia provannoides is a species of sea snail, a marine gastropod mollusk in the family Provannidae.

Cordesia provannoides is the only species in the genus Cordesia.

Description

Distribution
This species was originally described from specimens collected at the cold seeps along the Florida Escarpment in the Gulf of Mexico. It also occurs at methane seeps in deep water off the Congo River.

Larvae of the Cordesia provannoides, or a very similar species, has been collected 0–100 m below the surface in the tropical East Atlantic overlying a total water depth of 4570 m.

References
This article incorporates CC-BY-2.5 text from the reference 

Provannidae
Gastropods described in 2009